"Trustfall" is a song by American singer Pink, released as the second single from her ninth studio album Trustfall on January 27, 2023. It was co-written by Pink with Johnny McDaid and Fred Again, who also both produced the song.

Composition
The song contains a "driving EDM beat" and "emotionally fraught lyrics" about confronting fear and trusting things will work out.

Music video
The track's music video was released the same day as the song, and directed by Georgia Hudson. It stars Pink and a young woman who is trying to find the confidence to talk to a man she is interested in at a house party. Pink also stands atop a hotel and dances on a dark street, which was choreographed by Ryan Heffington.

Charts

Release history

References

2023 singles
2023 songs
Pink (singer) songs
Song recordings produced by Fred Again
Songs written by Fred Again
Songs written by Johnny McDaid
Songs written by Pink (singer)